Thenampadugai Thattimal is a village in the Kumbakonam taluk of Thanjavur district, Tamil Nadu, India.

Demographics 

As per the 2001 census, Thenampadugai Thattimal had a total population of 778 with 384 males and 394 females. The sex ratio was 1026. The literacy rate was 58.51

References 

 

Villages in Thanjavur district